Colonel Juan Blas Hernández (January 20, 1879 – November 9, 1933) was a prominent figure in the 1933 revolt against Gerardo Machado. He led various successful campaigns against Machado's troops en route to Havana.

He was invited to Havana on the request of the newly propped-up government of Ramón Grau and Fulgencio Batista, who feared he would, again, rise up in arms. He was asked to enter Havana unarmed by the Government of Grau & Batista. Blas Hernandez, although known as El Sandino de Cuba, supported the land reform through small holdings and was therefore an ideological enemy of Antonio Guiteras, who favored collective holdings. Blas Hernandez rose revolt against Batista, with  assistance from the ABC membership, and made strong at Atarés Castle in Havana (see Infrastructure of Cuba). Batista used heavy artillery especially from the Cuban Naval Vessel Patria firing from the Harbor. The artillery caused massive losses and forced surrender. On surrender Hernandez was called out by name and when he answered he was immediately assassinated by a member of Batista's army

References

Lazo, Mario 1972 El primer año de Castro. Chapter 10. Daga en el corazón. Minerva Books, New York. Printed in Barcelona Photos: Blas Hernandez with Batista page 49.

1879 births
1933 deaths
Assassinated Cuban people
People murdered in Cuba